This is a list of Filipino Canadians who have made significant contributions to Canadian culture, politics, or society. It also includes those with notable mentions in Canadian media.

Academia 

Chris Alcantara, Ph.D. - Professor of Graduate Chair at the University of Western Ontario's Department of Political Science, specializing in  collective action and intergovernmental cooperation in Canada.
Patrick Alcedo, Ph.D. - Associate Professor of dance specializing in dance ethnography and Filipino traditional dances at York University's  School of the Arts, Media, Performance and Design (AMPD).
Leonora Angeles, Ph.D. - Associate Professor at the School of Community and Regional Planning and the Institute for Gender, Race, Sexuality and Social Justice at the University of British Columbia. Among her specialties are community and international development studies and social policy, participatory planning and governance, and participatory action research.
Michael Barrios Batu, Ph.D.- Assistant Professor of Economics at the University of the Fraser Valley.
Bobby Benedicto, Ph.D. - Assistant Professor of media and sexuality at McGill University's Department of  Art History and Communication Studies and the Institute for Gender, Sexuality, and Feminist Studies (IGSF), specializing in  intersections of queer theory, critical race theory, urban studies, and theories of death and temporality.
John Paul Catungal, Ph.D- Assistant Professor at the University of British Columbia's Institute for Gender, Race, Sexuality and Social Justice, specializing in the areas of queer of colour geographies, critical race and ethnic studies, diaspora and transnationalism, critical pedagogy, the scholarship of teaching and learning, and the lived geographies of sexual and racial minorities in educational spaces.
Cesi Cruz, Ph.D- Assistant Professor at the University of British Columbia's Department of Political Science and Vancouver School of Economics, specializing in public opinion and electoral politics, social network analysis, political economy, and comparative politics.
Patrick Cruz, MFA - Assistant Professor of Studio Art at the University of Toronto Scarborough and the John H. Daniels Faculty of Architecture, ,Landscape, and Design, specializing in folk spirituality, diasporic aesthetics, cultural hybridity, and the ongoing project of decolonization.
Jessica Trisko-Darden, Ph.D. - activist, former model, beauty queen, and assistant professor of international development and conflict at American University's School of International Service 
Robert Diaz, Ph.D.- Associate Professor in the Women and Gender Studies Institute (WGSI) at University of Toronto. He specializes in sexuality studies, transnational feminisms, and the Philippines and its Diaspora.
Fay Faraday LLB, MA - Assistant Professor at Osgoode Hall Law School, specializing in  precarious employment, migrant labour, intersectional equality rights, human rights.
May Farrales, Ph.D.- Assistant Professor at Simon Fraser University's Department of Geography and  the Department of Gender Sexuality and Women's Studies, specializing in urban social change.
Cynthia Goh, Ph.D.- Professor at the University of Toronto's Department of Chemistry and Department of Materials Science and Engineering, the Institute of Medical Science, and the Munk School of Global Affairs. She specializes in chemical biophysics, biomaterials, nano science, diffractive optics, and knowledge translation.
Eric Kuhonta, Ph.D- Associate Professor in the Department of Political Science and Director of the Institute for the Study of International Development at McGill University, specializing in  political development, with a regional focus on Southeast Asia.
Gina Lacuesta, MD, FRCPC - Assistant Professor of allergy and clinical immunology at Dalhousie University's Department of Medicine, Division of Internal Medicine.
Marissa Largo, Ph.D- Assistant Professor of Creative Technologies and Art Education in the Department of Visual Art and Art History in the School of Arts, Media, Performance & Design at York University.
Adrian De Leon, Ph.D- Assistant Professor of American Studies & Ethnicity at the University of Southern California, specializing in Filipino Studies, Asian American History, Indigenous Asias, Settler Colonialism, Visual Culture, Racial Capitalism, Creative Writing.
Conely De Leon, Ph.D- Assistant Professor at Ryerson University's Department of Sociology, specializing in gender, migration, care work, transnational solidarities, and critical race theory.
Shelley Lumba, Ph.D-Assistant Professor of Developmental Biology and Genetics at the University of Toronto's Department of Cell and System's Biology.Shelley Lumba Researcher aims to alleviate global hunger by deciphering the molecular 'language' of plants
Phil De Luna, Ph.D-youngest program director in the history of the National Research Council of Canada, Director of the Materials for Clean Fuels Challenge Program at the National Research Council of Canada, Forbes 30 under 30 - Energy
Romulo F. Magsino - dean of the Faculty of Education, University of Manitoba.
 Ann Makosinski - student inventor and public speaker of Filipino, Polish and Canadian descent
 Rogemar Mamon, Ph.D. - mathematician, professor at the University of Western Ontario's Department of Statistical and Actuarial Sciences.
Julius Poncelet Manapul, MA - artist, Assistant Professor and Associate Chair of Contemporary Drawing & Painting at Ontario College of Art and Design University's Faculty of Art.
Casey Mecija, Ph.D.-musician, filmmaker, and Assistant Professor at York University's Department of Communication Studies, specializing in sound studies; queer diaspora studies; and Filipinx studies.
Fritz Pino, Ph.D. - Assistant Professor at the University of Regina's Faculty of Social Work, specializing in the lives and experiences of historically marginalized communities, particularly those who identify as LGBTQ, racialized immigrant, and older adults.
Anna Su, SJD - associate professor at the University of Toronto's Faculty of Law specializing in law and religion, and the law and history of international human rights.
Yvonne Su, Ph.D.-Assistant Professor at York University's Department of Equity Studies, specializing in forced migration, queer migration, diaspora studies and post-disaster recovery
Ruby Sullan, Ph.D.- Assistant Professor at the University of Toronto Scarborough's Department of Physical and Environmental Sciences, specializing in mechano-microbiology and materials-biosystems interactions.
Jessica Ticar, Ph.D.-Assistant Professor of Social Justice & Community Studies at St. Mary's University
Rose Ann Torres, Ph.D. Director and Assistant Professor in the School of Social Work, Algoma University. Specializes in Critical Race Feminism, Qualitative Research Methodology: Ethics and Responsibilities, Anti-Asian Racism, Critical Indigenous Studies, Critical Community Engagement’s
Ethel Tungohan, Ph.D.- Associate Professor of Political Science and Social Science in the Faculty of Liberal Arts and Professional Studies at York University.  Canada Research Chair in Canadian Migration vs Policy, Impacts and Activism.
Rosario Adapon Turvey, Ph.D.- Associate Professor at Lakehead University's Department of Geography and The Environmental Sustainability Sciences, specializing in  vulnerability and small island states, economic security, diplomacy, and international development.
Eleanor Ty, Ph.D. - FRSC, is a Professor in the Department of English and Film Studies at Wilfrid Laurier University.

Arts and letters

Dance 

AC Bonifacio - dancer/female member of Lucky Aces
Alvin Erasga Tolentino - choreographer and dance artist

Graphic arts 

Adrian Alphona - comic book artist, Runaways, Ms. Marvel
 Mike del Mundo - comic book artist, Weirdworld, Thor
Ariana Cuvin - graphic designer; Canada 150th logo contest winner
Derek Desierto - illustrator 
Francis Manapul - comic book artist and writer
Lorina Mapa - Quebec-based graphic artist 
Francisco Reyes - illustrator and comic strip artist who is regarded as the "King of the Philippine-jungle lord school of comics-strip writing"

Visual arts 

Stephanie Comilang - artist and filmmaker
 Charlie Frenal - painter 
Lani Maestro
Esmie Gayo McLaren - visual artist based in Vancouver
Sofronio Y. Mendoza - painter, known in the Philippine and International art circle as "SYM"
Ignacio "Mogi" Mogado - sculptor
Bert Monterona - painter, educator
Jill Paz - artist
Rod Pedralba - painter
Marigold Santos - inter-disciplinary artist 
Rommel Tingzon - painter
Noel Trinidad - painter

Journalism 

Melissa Grelo - co-host of CP24 Breakfast and the moderator of The Social
Hazel Mae - sportscaster; anchor on MLB Network
Rhea Santos - video journalist, OMNI Television Filipino National Newscast, Rogers Sports & Media
Ron Cagalac - journalist; male anchor of OMNI Television based in Vancouver
Erica Natividad - journalist, anchor of CityNews Toronto
Pauline Chan - journalist, reporter for CTV Toronto 
Zuridah Alman - journalist, reporter for CTV Toronto 
Kris Reyes - journalist, reporter for CBC News and former host of Global's The Morning Show
Kayla-Marie Tracy - journalist, reporter and anchor for CP24

Law 

Steve A. Coroza - first Filipino-Canadian appointed to the judicial Bench in Canada (Ontario Court of Appeal) 
L. Bernette Ho - second Filipina-Canadian appointed to the judicial Bench in Canada (Alberta Court of Appeal) 
Aubrey Danielle Hilliard - third Filipina-Canadian appointed to the judicial Bench in Canada (Ontario Courts of Justice) 
Gail Gatchalian - fourth Filipina-Canadian appointed to the judicial Bench in Canada (Nova Scotia Supreme Court) 
Fay Faraday - Filipina-Armenian social justice lawyer and assistant professor at Osgoode Hall Law School.
George Garvida - lawyer
Alicia Natividad - first Filipino woman to be called to the Bar of Ontario

Literature 

Albert Casuga - Philippines-born Canadian writer
Petronila Cleto - writer and activist
Emmanuelle Chateauneuf - Sault Ste. Marie, Ont.-based writer 
Therese Estacion - poet 
Edmundo Farolan - writer
Eleanor Guerrero-Campbell - writer, former urban planner
Patrick de Belen - Toronto-based Filipino spoken word poet, performer
C. E. Gatchalian – playwright, poet, fictionist
Catherine Hernandez - novelist, children's book writer, playwright
Alia Ceniza Rasul - poet 
Patty Rivera - poet
Jhet van Ruyven - Filipino-Canadian author who wrote the auto-biographical book The Tale of Juliet
Alexis Tioseco - film critic
Mel Tobias - writer
Jia Tolentino - Toronto-born American writer and editor
J. Torres – award-winning Filipino-born Canadian comic book writer

Theater 

Byron Abalos - actor, playwright, director and theatre producer
Nina Lee Aquino - Filipina-Canadian playwright, director, dramaturge, and actor, based in Toronto 
Leon Aureus - actor, playwright, producer, short filmmaker and a founding Artistic Director of Fu-GEN, an Asian-Canadian Theatre Company
Ma-Anne Dionisio – actress; roles include Kim (Miss Saigon) and Eponine (Les Misérables)
Flerida Peña - playwright
Jovanni Sy - Canadian playwright, actor, and director, with Chinese-Filipino ancestry

Business 

Victor Cui - CEO and owner of the MMA promotion ONE FC
Agnes P. Miranda - executive vice-chairman of World Financial Group; recipient of RBC Top 25 Canadian Immigrants Award in 2017
Dominic Penaloza - CEO & founder of Ushi and WorldFriends
Macario 'Tobi' Reyes - CEO & President of PortLiving, Vancouver-based development company

Fashion and pageantry

Pageants 

Karla Henry - Miss Earth 2008
Bea Santiago - Miss International 2013
Riza Santos - Miss Earth Canada 2006, Miss World Canada 2011 and Miss Universe Canada 2013
Tisha Silang – former Bb. Pilipinas-Universe; beauty queen; TV host; entrepreneur

Labor 

Columbia 'Coco' Diaz -  program manager for Intercede, an Ontario advocacy group for domestic workers
Virginia Guiang-Santoro - founder of Filipino Domestic Workers Association of Manitoba
Ging Hernandez - Philippine-born advocate for domestic care workers and known women's rights activist
Juana Tejada - Filipino caregiver who campaigned for overseas Filipino workers' (OFW) and immigrants' rights in Canada
Pura Velasco - Philippine-born advocate for caregivers
Fely Villasin - advocate for domestic workers, care givers and new immigrants, founder/artistic director of Carlos Bulosan Theatre

Health Science 

Eileen de Villa - medical officer of health for the city of Toronto
Lynn Farrales - doctor, co-founded Still Life Canada, non-profit for support and research on stillbirth and neonatal deaths
Gigi Osler - President of the Canadian Medical Association
Nestor Yanga - a family physician in Toronto, was the only North American physician to die of SARS

Politics 

Cris Aglugub – Manitoba former NDP MLA, the Maples (1999-2007),  former Legislative Assistant to the Minister of Labour and Immigration, and subsequently to the Minister of Intergovernmental Affairs and Trade.
Carl Benito - former MLA for Edmonton-Mill Woods (2008-2012)
Lisa Bower - Councillor for Town of Ajax, Ontario (2018–present).
Yvonne Clarke - first Filipina MLA (Portercreek 2021–present) in the Yukon Legislative Assembly
Narima dela Cruz - politician
Jocelyn Curteanu - City councillor at Whitehorse (2012–present),  Whitehorse City Council's representative on the City's Canadian Coalition of Municipalities Against Racism and Discrimination (CCMARD) Advisory Committee and the Persons with Disabilities Advisory Committee (PDAC).
Mable Elmore – first Filipina-Canadian MLA in BC (NDP) (2009–present), current Parliamentary Secretary for Seniors’ Services and Long-Term Care (2020–present), former Parliamentary Secretary for Poverty Reduction of British Columbia (2017–2020), former Spokesperson for Temporary Foreign Workers and Immigration and former the Deputy Spokesperson for Finance.
Edwin Empinado - former nurse, first Canadian Filipino to be elected as municipal councillor in B.C. Currently serving as an Elected Municipal Councillor in the District of Kitimat (2010–Present).
Tobias C. Enverga – first Filipino-Canadian Senator (Conservative); first Filipino-Canadian and visible minority elected to the City of Toronto in 2010 (to the Toronto Catholic District School Board as trustee)
Flor Marcelino – first Filipino woman and racialized woman elected MLA in Manitoba (2007-2019), former Leader of the Opposition (2016-2017), Minister of Multiculturalism and Literacy (2013-2016), and Minister of Culture, Heritage, and Tourism (2009-2013).
Malaya Marcelino - MLA in Manitoba- Notre Dame (2019–present)
Ted Marcelino – former MLA in Manitoba, first MLA for the electoral district of Tyndall Park (2011-2019) 
Rey Pagtakhan – first Filipino-Canadian Member of Parliament (1988–2004), first Filipino-Canadian Cabinet Minister (2001–2004), former Minister of Western Economic Diversification(2003–2004),Minister of Veterans Affairs (2002–2003), Senior Minister for Manitoba (2002–2004),Secretary of State (Science, Research and Development) (2002–2003), and Secretary of State (Asia-Pacific) (2001–2002).
Jon Reyes - Conservative MLA (St. Norbert 2016–2019, Waverley 2019-present) and Minister of Economic Development and Jobs in Manitoba (2020–present), former special envoy for military affairs.
Conrad Santos – first Filipino Canadian elected in Canada (elected as MLA in Manitoba (1981-1988,1990-2007), and first Filipino Canadian to run for the leadership of a political party (Manitoba NDP, 1989)
Rowena Santos - first Filipino councillor in City of Brampton, Vice Chair of Audit and Risk, and Chair of Community Services (2018–present) 
Rommel Silverio -  first Filipino councillor in City of Yellowknife(2015–present).
Rechie Valdez - first Filipina woman elected MP, current MP for Mississauga-Streetsville 
Arturo (Art) Tapiador Viola - first Filipino Mayor elected in Canada, Serving as Lord Mayor, Deputy Lord Mayor, and City Councillor of Niagara on the Lake from 1994 to 2010. Awarded the Queen Elizabeth II's Diamond Jubilee Medal in 2012.
Tany Yao - Conservative MLA in Alberta in the riding of Fort McMurray-Wood Buffalo (2015–present)

Sports 

Sean Anthony - Filipino-Canadian professional basketball player for the Phoenix Super LPG Fuel Masters of the Philippine Basketball Association (PBA)
Eve Badana - football goalkeeper
Matthew Baldisimo -  midfielder for Pacific FC
Michael Baldisimo - soccer player for Vancouver Whitecaps FC
Jonathan de Guzmán – midfielder for Feyenoord Rotterdam
Julian de Guzman - soccer coach and former professional player
Kadin Chung - soccer player for Pacific FC
Aidan Daniels - midfielder for Colorado Springs Switchbacks
Crispin Duenas – Olympic archer
Mathew Dumba - professional hockey player (NHL)
Leylah Annie Fernandez - tennis player
Rey Fortaleza – Olympic boxer
James Forrester - professional basketball player
Victor Hadfield - professional ice hockey player for Manitoba Moose
Gilmore Junio - Winter Olympics long track speed skater
A. J. Mandani - former PBA & ABL basketball player
Patrick Metcalfe - soccer player for Vancouver Whitecaps FC
Nick O'Donnell - soccer player for Philippines national football team in 2014
Alex Pagulayan – 2004 world pool champion
Victoria Pickett - professional soccer player
Kharis Ralph - former ice dancer
Rebecca Rivera - professional volleyball player
Jesse Shugg - international soccer player
Kat Tolentino - professional volleyball player
Norbert Torres - professional basketball player
Matthew Wright - basketball player for Kyoto Hannaryz, former PBA player. 
Kayla Sanchez - Olympic swimmer

Photography 

Stuart Dee - Vancouver photographer
Allan Florendo - Vancouver-based photographer
Ally Gonzalo - Winnipeg-based photographer

Television and film

Television 

Chasty Ballesteros - actress, who has had roles in Smallville, Supernatural, Psych, Sanctuary, Ray Donovan, The Ranch, and How I Met Your Mother
Eric Bauza - voice actor, stand-up comedian and animation artist
Carlos Bustamante (TV personality) - Television host, actor and voice actor best known as the host of The Zone on YTV, currently a reporter on ET Canada
Chris Casillan - professional actor, improviser, comedian, and musician
Nancy Castiglione – half Italian and half Filipina actress and singer in the Philippines; actress on Sana Ay Ikaw Na Nga
Lexa Doig – actress on Stargate SG-1 and Gene Roddenberry's Andromeda
Manny Jacinto - film and television actor
Ron Josol - actor and stand-up comedian
Amanda Joy - actress, screenwriter, comedian, satirist, and producer
Alex Mallari Jr. - a Canadian actor, best known for his portrayal of Four/Ryo Tetsuda/Ryo Ishida in the 2015 Syfy television series Dark Matter
Shay Mitchell – actress on Pretty Little Liars
Keith Pedro - comedian
Ann Pornel – comedian, host The Great Canadian Baking Show
Ariel Rivera – singer-songwriter, multi-platinum recording artist, actor
Jeff Rustia – TV host and VJ, BPM:TV
Gervacio Santos - film editor
Cassie Steele – actress on Degrassi: The Next Generation
Veena Sud - television writer, director, and producer
Cheryl Torrenueva -  designer, best known as a personality on television shows produced by HGTV Canada
Louriza Tronco - actress and singer
Beverly Vergel - actress and film writer, director and producer
Jessalyn Wanlim - actress and model

Reality show 

Celeste Anderson - competitive gamer and reality television personality
Mikey Bustos - Canadian Idol finalist; singer from Toronto
Erika Casupanan - Survivor 41  Sole Survivor; first Canadian to win
Darren Espanto - The Voice Kids Philippines season one runner-up, singer, recording artist
Elise Estrada – singer; recording artist; Pinoy Pop Superstar finalist
Elena Juatco – Canadian Idol finalist; roving reporter for season 4 of Canadian Idol
John Alvarez – ChefChopped Canada Chef contestant; Chopped Canada

Film 

Paul Denham Austerberry - production designer
Rogelio Balagtas - actor
Joella Cabalu - Vancouver-based documentary filmmaker
Tirso Cruz III - Filipino actor, comedian, and singer of French Canadian descent
Seán Devlin - filmmaker and comedian
Von Flores - actor
Jon Jon Rivero - Documentary Producer of Balikbayan Project  and Edify Edmonton's Top 40 Under 40 2021 awardee 
Gervacio Santos - film editor
Marco Grazzini - film and television actor
Haji -  actress of British and Filipino descent
Mig Macario – actor; filmmaker; played roles on Once Upon A Time, Less Than Kind, The Troop, Santa Baby 2, Fringe
Ellie Posadas - actress
Lisa Valencia-Svensson - Emmy Award-winning documentary producer

Internet 

Sabrina Cruz -  YouTube personality best known for her main channel, formerly known as NerdyAndQuirky
Elle Mills - known by her YouTube username ElleOfTheMills
Dominic Panganiban - animator more known by his nickname and YouTube channel Domics

Disc jockeys 

Mark Anthony - co-launched the web-based music label Dark Panties Recordings

Music 

Joey Albert – recording artist
Maria Aragon - singer
Warren Dean Flandez - R&B and gospel singeT
Emmalyn Estrada – singer, songwriter
Carolyn Fe - Montreal jazz and blues artist
Carlo Gimenez – British Columbia-based guitarist of the American indie rock, acoustic band Meg & Dia
Emm Gryner – Toronto-based singer/songwriter of mixed Filipino ancestry; multiple Juno Awards nominee
Manila Grey - (stylized as MANILA GREY) are a Canadian R&B duo from Vancouver, British Columbia. They are most noted for receiving a Juno Award nomination for Breakthrough Group of the Year at the Juno Awards of 2021.
Martha Joy - singer, recording artist
Alexander Junior - musician, member of the band DATU
Killy - rapper
Kimmortal - musician, songwriter and visual artist based in Vancouver, British Columbia
Kytami - musician
Casey Mecija and Jennifer Mecija – musicians from the band Ohbijou
 Pressa — rapper
August Rigo - recording artist, songwriter, producer and musician
Alcvin Ramos - Japan born Canadian of Filipino heritage
Maylee Todd – indie pop singer

Other 

Christina Calayca - daycare worker who mysteriously disappeared on a camping trip in August 2007
Janet Mahilum-Haydock - daughter of a Filipino pen-pal bride featured in a documentary
Erik Mana - professional magician and mentalist
Arlene Oliveros - first Filipino sommelier in Canada
Jeff Rustia - executive director & founder of Toronto Men's Fashion Week

References

Canadians
Lists of people by ethnicity